Kjotve the Rich (Old Norse: Kjǫtvi hinn auðgi, Norwegian: Kjøtve den Rike) was a king of Agder, then one of the  petty kingdoms of Norway  during  the late 9th century.  Kjotve led the western Norwegian kings against King Harald Fairhair (Harald Hårfagre) at the Battle of Hafrsfjord (Slaget i Hafrsfjorden). Defeated by Harald, Kjotve fled; many of his allies were killed in the battle. His son Thorir Haklang was a berserker who fell during the Battle of Hafrsfjord.

Popular Culture
Kjotve appears as the first main assassination target under the name "Kjotve the Cruel" in Assassin's Creed Valhalla. Contrary to history, Kjotve's son in the game is instead named Gorm Kjotvesson, furthermore, in the mobile title Assassin's Creed: Rebellion through a tie-in event, The Ravens' Wound, Kjotve has a second son, Hrolfr. In the prequel comic limited series, Assassin's Creed Valhalla: Song of Glory by Cavan Scott, Kjotve is correctly referred to by his epitaph "the Rich." 

Kjotve appears in Paradox Interactive's Crusader Kings series, ruling the province of Agder.

References

External links
  Battle in Hafersfjord

Norwegian petty kings
9th-century Norwegian monarchs
9th-century rulers in Europe